BHPV is a neighbourhood situated on Visakhapatnam. Its full form is Bharat Heavy Plate & Vessels Ltd township. It was established in the 1960s for BHPV employees.

About
BHPV is a planned township and well connected to all corners of the city, having all basic amenities like school, ATMs, banks and super markets.

References

Neighbourhoods in Visakhapatnam